Herman Francies Joseph De Croo (born 12 August 1937) is a Belgian politician of the Open Flemish Liberals and Democrats. First elected in March 1968, he is the longest serving Belgian member of parliament, serving uninterrupted until 2014. He is the father of incumbent prime minister Alexander De Croo.

He went to school at Collège Saint-Stanislas in Mons. He obtained a doctorate in law from the Université Libre de Bruxelles in 1961, and later attended the University of Chicago Law School on a Fulbright Scholarship. 

From 1999 until July 2007, De Croo was the President of the Chamber of Representatives, the lower house of the country's Federal Parliament. He is the current mayor of Brakel.

De Croo was first elected to the Chamber of Representatives in 1968 for the PVV-PLP. He has since served in various governments as minister of Transport and Foreign Trade; minister of Transport, Postal Services, Telegraphy and Telephony; minister of Education and minister of Postal Services, Telegraphy, Telephony and Pensions.

Herman De Croo, who holds a Ph.D. in law, is a former Professor of Common Law at the Vrije Universiteit Brussel.

De Croo has been President of the European Transport Safety Council since it was founded in 1993.

Honours 
 Minister of State since 3 June 1998.
 : 1st class - Grand Cross of the Order of Merit of the Republic of Poland.

Bibliography
Parlement et Gouvernement (1965)
Het Parlement aan het werk, de taak van de hedendaagse vertegenwoordiging" (1966)
België/Belgique : Service Nation (1985 and 1988)
De wereld volgens Herman De Croo (1999)

References

External links

1937 births
Belgian Ministers of State
Free University of Brussels (1834–1969) alumni
Living people
Members of the Chamber of Representatives (Belgium)
Open Vlaamse Liberalen en Democraten politicians
Presidents of the Chamber of Representatives (Belgium)
Grand Crosses of the Order of Merit of the Republic of Poland
University of Chicago Law School alumni
21st-century Belgian politicians
Fulbright alumni